Brevifolin is a bioactive compound found in pomegranate. The pharmacological profile of brevifolin is reported similar to ellagic acid, particularly with regards to absorption, distribution, and elimination rates.

References 

Aromatic ketones
Natural phenols
Pomegranates